Farmersville is a rural Mennonite settlement and a census-designated place (CDP) in West Earl Township, Lancaster County, Pennsylvania, United States. As of the 2010 census the population was 991.

Geography
Farmersville is in northeastern Lancaster County, in the eastern part of West Earl Township. Farmersville is near no major roads, with the town center being at the intersection of North Farmersville Road and East Farmersville Road. The Farmersville CDP includes the neighborhood of Fairmount to the east, at the intersection of East Farmersville Road and Katze Boucle Weeg (Cat's Back Road).

The community drains north to the Conestoga River and south to Groff Creek, a tributary of the Conestoga. The entire area is part of the Susquehanna River watershed.

Every Tuesday, Farmersville has a weekly auction.

Demographics

Notable people
 Floyd Landis, former professional cyclist; born in Farmersville

References

Populated places in Lancaster County, Pennsylvania